The men's 40 km points race competition at the 1998 Asian Games was held on 17 December at Huamark Velodrome.

Schedule
All times are Indochina Time (UTC+07:00)

Results 
Legend
DNF — Did not finish

References

External links 
Results

Track Men points race